The Yale Bulldogs represented Yale University in ECAC women's ice hockey during the 2015–16 NCAA Division I women's ice hockey season. The Bulldogs narrowly missed qualifying for the ECAC Tournament.

Offseason

July 23: Hanna Åström was invited to the National Team Camp for Sweden.

Recruiting

2015–16 Bulldogs

Schedule

|-
!colspan=12 style=""| Regular Season

References

Yale
Yale Bulldogs women's ice hockey seasons
Yale Bulldogs
Yale Bulldogs